Heiligenstein is a commune in the Bas-Rhin department in Alsace in north-eastern France. Its name means holy rock.

See also
 Klevener de Heiligenstein, a wine from Heiligenstein and surrounding villages
Communes of the Bas-Rhin department

References

Communes of Bas-Rhin
Bas-Rhin communes articles needing translation from French Wikipedia